The 1971 Rothmans 250 was motor race for Group E Series Production Touring Cars. It was staged on 7 November 1971 at the Surfers Paradise International Raceway in Queensland, Australia, over a 250-mile distance. The race, which was Heat 5 of the 1971 Australian Manufacturers' Championship, was won by Allan Moffat driving a Ford Falcon GTHO.

Classes
As a heat of the 1971 Australian Manufacturers' Championship, classes were defined by a Capacity/Price Units formula with values for each model calculated by multiplying the engine capacity in litres by the retail price.

Results

The winning car completed the race in 3 hours 11 minutes 46.1 seconds at an average speed of 83 mph (133 km/h).

The above results table does not list all competitors, given that there were "over forty starters" in the race.

References

External links
 Image of model of winning car at www.motorfocus.com.au

Rothmans 250
Motorsport at Surfers Paradise International Raceway